Hungarian Rhapsody No. 9, S.244/9, in E-flat major, is the ninth Hungarian Rhapsody by Franz Liszt. It is nicknamed the "Carnival in Pest" or "Pesther Carneval" and was composed in 1847. A typical performance of the piece lasts ten minutes.

Liszt also made versions of the piece for piano four hands and for piano, violin, and cello.

Sources of the melodies 
Liszt used five themes in this rhapsody. The first of these, possibly Italian in origin, can be found in one Liszt's manuscript notebooks. The second theme is a csárdás by an unknown composer. After the third theme, which is an unidentified folk tune, Liszt quotes an authentic Hungarian folk song, A kertmegi káposzta. The final theme quoted is a third folk tune, Mikor én még legény voltam.

References

External links 
 

09
1847 compositions

Compositions in E-flat major